The Waschberg Formation is a geologic formation in Austria. It preserves fossils dating back to the Paleogene period.

See also 
 List of fossiliferous stratigraphic units in Austria

References 

Geologic formations of Austria
Eocene Series of Europe
Paleogene Austria
Lutetian Stage
Ypresian Stage
Limestone formations
Shallow marine deposits
Paleontology in Austria